Harris Mowbray (/hæ.ɹɪs moʊbreɪ/; born 1999) is an amateur linguist and programmer from the United States. He is notable for creating several proposals to encode minority languages around the world in Braille, such as the Gagauz language and the Sorbian language. He was widely featured in Polish press for his Kashubian Braille proposal. His Braille alphabets' proposals have been accepted for the Livonian language, Fulani language, and Lakota language. He also created a manual alphabet (sign language alphabet) for the Fulani language, based on the Adlam script. In March 2021, Harris Mowbray prepared a Braille proposal for two official languages of the US Northern Mariana Islands, Chamorro and Carolinian In mid-2021, the Udi community of Azerbaijan accepted his proposal for Braille in their language. Mowbray also helped digitize Georgian Braille. 

In late 2021, Harris developed Braille for the First Nations language Smalgyax spoken in northern British Columbia, the Elfdalian language, and the Rusyn language.

By early 2022, Harris had collaborated with the World Uyghur Congress to create Braille for the Uyghur language with the support of other researchers. He also worked with the Khoekhoegowab speaking community of Namibia to develop Braille for their language's orthography.

Harris attended American University in Washington DC.

References

Linguists from the United States

1999 births
Braille
Living people